The Writers Guild of America Awards is an award for film, television, and radio writing including both fiction and non-fiction categories given by the Writers Guild of America, East and Writers Guild of America West since 1949.

Eligibility 
The screen awards are for films that were exhibited theatrically during the preceding calendar year. The television awards are for series that were produced and aired between December 1 and November 30, regardless of how many episodes aired during this time period.

Additionally, scripts must be produced under the jurisdiction of the WGA or under a collective bargaining agreement in Canada, Ireland, New Zealand, or the United Kingdom.

Lifetime achievement awards 
Each year at the awards, two lifetime achievement awards are presented. One is for screenwriting, and the other is for TV writing:
 Laurel Award for TV Writing Achievement
 Laurel Award for Screenwriting Achievement

Categories 
(As of 2022.)

Film
 Best Adapted Screenplay
 Best Original Screenplay
 Best Documentary Screenplay

Television
 Comedy Series
 Drama Series
 Episodic Comedy
 Episodic Drama
 Long Form – Adapted
 Long Form – Original
 Adapted Short Form New Media
 New Series
 Animation
 Comedy/Variety Talk Series
 Comedy/Variety – Sketch Series
 Best Comedy/Variety – Specials
 Daytime Serials
 Children's Script
 Best Quizz and Audience
 Documentary Script – Current Events
 Documentary Script – Other Than Current Events

News
 TV News Script – Regularly Scheduled, Bulletin, or Breaking Report
 TV News Script – Analysis, Feature, or Commentary
 Digital News
Radio
 Radio News Script – Regularly Scheduled, Bulletin, or Breaking Report
 Radio News Script – Analysis, Feature or Commentary
 Radio Documentary

History 
In 2004, the awards show was broadcast on television for the first time.

In the years 2008 through 2018, the awards also included video game writing.

Discontinued categories 
 Best Written Musical (1949–1969)
 Best Written Western (1949–1951)
 Best Written Film Concerning American Scene (1949–1952)
 Best Written Drama (1949–1969)
 Best Drama Written Directly for the Screenplay (1970–1984)
 Best Drama Adapted from Another Media (1970–1984)
 Best Written Comedy (1949–1969)
 Best Comedy Written Directly for the Screenplay (1970–1984)
 Best Comedy Adapted from Another Media (1970–1984)
 Best Videogame Writing (2008–2018)

Ceremonies 

 1st Writers Guild of America Awards
 2nd Writers Guild of America Awards
 3rd Writers Guild of America Awards
 4th Writers Guild of America Awards
 5th Writers Guild of America Awards
 6th Writers Guild of America Awards
 7th Writers Guild of America Awards
 8th Writers Guild of America Awards
 9th Writers Guild of America Awards
 10th Writers Guild of America Awards
 11th Writers Guild of America Awards
 12th Writers Guild of America Awards
 13th Writers Guild of America Awards
 14th Writers Guild of America Awards
 15th Writers Guild of America Awards
 16th Writers Guild of America Awards
 17th Writers Guild of America Awards
 18th Writers Guild of America Awards
 19th Writers Guild of America Awards
 20th Writers Guild of America Awards

 21st Writers Guild of America Awards
 22nd Writers Guild of America Awards
 23rd Writers Guild of America Awards
 24th Writers Guild of America Awards
 25th Writers Guild of America Awards
 26th Writers Guild of America Awards
 27th Writers Guild of America Awards
 28th Writers Guild of America Awards
 29th Writers Guild of America Awards
 30th Writers Guild of America Awards
 31st Writers Guild of America Awards
 32nd Writers Guild of America Awards
 33rd Writers Guild of America Awards
 34th Writers Guild of America Awards
 35th Writers Guild of America Awards
 36th Writers Guild of America Awards
 37th Writers Guild of America Awards
 38th Writers Guild of America Awards
 39th Writers Guild of America Awards
 40th Writers Guild of America Awards

 41st Writers Guild of America Awards
 42nd Writers Guild of America Awards
 43rd Writers Guild of America Awards
 44th Writers Guild of America Awards
 45th Writers Guild of America Awards
 46th Writers Guild of America Awards
 47th Writers Guild of America Awards
 48th Writers Guild of America Awards
 49th Writers Guild of America Awards
 50th Writers Guild of America Awards
 51st Writers Guild of America Awards
 52nd Writers Guild of America Awards
 53rd Writers Guild of America Awards
 54th Writers Guild of America Awards
 55th Writers Guild of America Awards
 56th Writers Guild of America Awards
 57th Writers Guild of America Awards
 58th Writers Guild of America Awards
 59th Writers Guild of America Awards
 60th Writers Guild of America Awards

 61st Writers Guild of America Awards
 62nd Writers Guild of America Awards
 63rd Writers Guild of America Awards
 64th Writers Guild of America Awards
 65th Writers Guild of America Awards
 66th Writers Guild of America Awards
 67th Writers Guild of America Awards
 68th Writers Guild of America Awards
 69th Writers Guild of America Awards
 70th Writers Guild of America Awards
 71st Writers Guild of America Awards
 72nd Writers Guild of America Awards
 73rd Writers Guild of America Awards
 74th Writers Guild of America Awards
 75th Writers Guild of America Awards

Winners 
A * denotes a film that also went on to win an Academy Award.

Films

Current awards 

Best Original Screenplay
 1967: Bonnie and Clyde – David Newman and Robert Benton
 1968: The Producers – Mel Brooks *
 1984: Broadway Danny Rose – Woody Allen
 1985: Witness – Pamela Wallace, William Kelley, and Earl W. Wallace *
 1986: Hannah and Her Sisters – Woody Allen *
 1987: Moonstruck – John Patrick Shanley *
 1988: Bull Durham – Ron Shelton
 1989: Crimes and Misdemeanors – Woody Allen
 1990: Avalon – Barry Levinson
 1991: Thelma & Louise – Callie Khouri *
 1992: The Crying Game – Neil Jordan *
 1993: The Piano – Jane Campion *
 1994: Four Weddings and a Funeral – Richard Curtis
 1995: Braveheart – Randall Wallace
 1996: Fargo – Joel Coen and Ethan Coen *
 1997: As Good as It Gets – Mark Andrus and James L. Brooks
 1998: Shakespeare in Love – Marc Norman and Tom Stoppard *
 1999: American Beauty – Alan Ball *
 2000: You Can Count on Me – Kenneth Lonergan
 2001: Gosford Park – Julian Fellowes *
 2002: Bowling for Columbine – Michael Moore
 2003: Lost in Translation – Sofia Coppola *
 2004: Eternal Sunshine of the Spotless Mind – Charlie Kaufman, Michael Gondry, and Pierre Bismuth *
 2005: Crash – Paul Haggis and Bobby Moresco *
 2006: Little Miss Sunshine – Michael Arndt *
 2007: Juno – Diablo Cody *
 2008: Milk – Dustin Lance Black *
 2009: The Hurt Locker – Mark Boal *
 2010: Inception – Christopher Nolan
 2011: Midnight in Paris – Woody Allen *
 2012: Zero Dark Thirty – Mark Boal
 2013: Her – Spike Jonze *
 2014: The Grand Budapest Hotel – Wes Anderson and Hugo Guinness
 2015: Spotlight – Tom McCarthy and Josh Singer *
 2016: Moonlight – Barry Jenkins; story by Tarell Alvin McCraney *
 2017: Get Out – Jordan Peele *
 2018: Eighth Grade – Bo Burnham
 2019: Parasite – Bong Joon-ho and Han Jin-won; story by Bong Joon-ho *
 2020: Promising Young Woman — Emerald Fennell *
 2021: Don't Look Up — Adam McKay and David Sirota
 2022: Everything Everywhere All at Once — Daniel Kwan and Daniel Scheinert *
Best Adapted Screenplay
 1984: The Killing Fields – Bruce Robinson
 1985: Prizzi's Honor – Richard Condon and Janet Roach
 1986: A Room with a View – Ruth Prawer Jhabvala *
 1987: Roxanne – Steve Martin
 1988: Dangerous Liaisons – Christopher Hampton *
 1989: Driving Miss Daisy – Alfred Uhry *
 1990: Dances with Wolves – Michael Blake *
 1991: The Silence of the Lambs – Ted Tally *
 1992: The Player – Michael Tolkin
 1993: Schindler's List – Steven Zaillian *
 1994: Forrest Gump – Eric Roth *
 1995: Sense and Sensibility – Emma Thompson *
 1996: Sling Blade – Billy Bob Thornton *
 1997: L.A. Confidential – Brian Helgeland and Curtis Hanson *
 1998: Out of Sight – Scott Frank
 1999: Election – Alexander Payne and Jim Taylor
 2000: Traffic – Stephen Gaghan *
 2001: A Beautiful Mind – Akiva Goldsman *
 2002: The Hours – David Hare
 2003: American Splendor – Shari Springer Berman and Robert Pulcini
 2004: Sideways – Alexander Payne and Jim Taylor *
 2005: Brokeback Mountain – Larry McMurty and Diana Ossana *
 2006: The Departed – William Monahan *
 2007: No Country for Old Men – Joel Coen and Ethan Coen *
 2008: Slumdog Millionaire – Simon Beaufoy *
 2009: Up in the Air – Jason Reitman
 2010: The Social Network – Aaron Sorkin *
 2011: The Descendants – Alexander Payne, Nat Faxon, and Jim Rash *
 2012: Argo – Chris Terrio *
 2013: Captain Phillips – Billy Ray
 2014: The Imitation Game – Graham Moore *
 2015: The Big Short – Adam McKay and Charles Randolph *
 2016: Arrival – Eric Heisserer
 2017: Call Me by Your Name — James Ivory *
 2018: Can You Ever Forgive Me? – Nicole Holofcener and Jeff Whitty
 2019: Jojo Rabbit – Taika Waititi *
 2020: Borat Subsequent Moviefilm — Screenplay by Sacha Baron Cohen & Anthony Hines & Dan Swimer & Peter Baynham & Erica Rivinoja & Dan Mazer & Jena Friedman & Lee Kern; story by Sacha Baron Cohen & Anthony Hines & Dan Swimer & Nina Pedrad; based on characters created by Sacha Baron Cohen
 2021: CODA – Sian Heder *
 2022: Women Talking – Sarah Polley *
Best Documentary Screenplay
 2004: Super Size Me – Morgan Spurlock
 2005: Enron: The Smartest Guys in the Room – Alex Gibney
 2006: Deliver Us from Evil – Amy J. Berg
 2007: Taxi to the Dark – Alex Gibney
 2008: Waltz with Bashir – Ari Folman
 2009: The Cove – Mark Monroe
 2010: Inside Job – Charles Ferguson
 2011: Better This World – Katie Galloway, and Kelly Duane de la Vega
 2012: Searching for Sugar Man – Malik Bendjelloul
 2013: Stories We Tell – Sarah Polley
 2014: The Internet's Own Boy: The Story of Aaron Swartz – Brian Knappenberger
 2015: Going Clear: Scientology and the Prison of Belief – Alex Gibney
 2016: Command and Control – Robert Kenner, Brian Pearle, Kim Roberts, and Eric Schlosser
 2017: Jane – Brett Morgen
 2018: Bathtubs Over Broadway – Ozzy Inguanzo, and Dava Whisenant
 2019: The Inventor: Out for Blood in Silicon Valley – Alex Gibney
 2020: The Dissident — Mark Monroe and Bryan Fogel
 2021: Exposing Muybridge – Marc Shaffer
 2022: Moonage Daydream – Brett Morgen

Discontinued categories 

Best Written Drama
 1949: The Snake Pit – Frank Partos and Millen Brand
 1950: All the King's Men – Robert Rossen
 1951: Sunset Boulevard – Charles Brackett, Billy Wilder, and D. M. Marshman Jr. *
 1952: A Place in the Sun – Michael Wilson and Harry Brown *
 1953: High Noon – Carl Foreman
 1954: From Here to Eternity – Daniel Taradash *
 1955: On the Waterfront – Budd Schulberg *
 1956: Marty – Paddy Chayefsky *
 1957: Friendly Persuasion – Michael Wilson
 1958: 12 Angry Men – Reginald Rose
 1959: The Defiant Ones – Nedrick Young and Harold Jacob Smith *
 1960: The Diary of Anne Frank – Frances Goodrich and Albert Hackett
 1961: Elmer Gantry – Richard Brooks *
 1962: The Hustler – Sidney Carroll and Robert Rossen
 1963: To Kill a Mockingbird – Horton Foote *
 1964: Hud – Harriet Frank Jr. and Irving Ravetch
 1965: Becket – Edward Anhalt *
 1966: The Pawnbroker – Edward Lewis Wallant, Morton Fine, and David Friedkin
 1967: Who's Afraid of Virginia Woolf? – Ernest Lehman
 1968: Bonnie and Clyde – David Newman and Robert Benton
 1969: The Lion in Winter – James Goldman *
Best Original Drama
 1970: Butch Cassidy and the Sundance Kid – William Goldman *
 1971: Patton – Francis Ford Coppola and Edmund H. North *
 1972: Sunday Bloody Sunday – Penelope Gilliatt
 1973: The Candidate – Jeremy Larner *
 1974: Save the Tiger – Steve Shagan
 1975: Chinatown – Robert Towne *
 1976: Dog Day Afternoon – Frank Pierson *
 1977: Network – Paddy Chayefsky *
 1978: The Turning Point – Arthur Laurents
 1979: Coming Home – Nancy Dowd, Robert C. Jones, and Waldo Salt *
 1980: The China Syndrome – Mike Gray, T. S. Cook and James Bridges
 1981: Melvin and Howard – Bo Goldman *
 1982: Reds – Warren Beatty and Trevor Griffiths
 1983: E.T. the Extra-Terrestrial – Melissa Mathison
 1984: Tender Mercies – Horton Foote *
Best Adapted Drama
 1970: Midnight Cowboy – Waldo Salt *
 1971: I Never Sang for My Father – Robert Anderson
 1972: The French Connection – Ernest Tidyman *
 1973: The Godfather – Mario Puzo and Francis Ford Coppola *
 1974: Serpico – Waldo Salt and Norman Wexler
 1975: The Godfather Part II – Francis Ford Coppola and Mario Puzo *
 1976: One Flew Over the Cuckoo's Nest – Bo Goldman and Lawrence Hauben *
 1977: All the President's Men – William Goldman *
 1978: Islands in the Stream – Denne Bart Petitclerc
 1979: Midnight Express – Oliver Stone *
 1980: Kramer vs. Kramer – Robert Benton *
 1981: Ordinary People – Alvin Sargent *
 1982: On Golden Pond – Ernest Thompson *
 1983: Missing – Costa-Gavras and Donald E. Stewart *
 1984: Reuben, Reuben – Julius J. Epstein

Best Written Comedy
 1949: Sitting Pretty – F. Hugh Herbert
 1950: A Letter to Three Wives – Joseph L. Mankiewicz *
 1951: All About Eve – Joseph L. Mankiewicz *
 1952: Father's Little Dividend – Albert Hackett and Frances Goodrich
 1953: The Quiet Man – Frank Nugent
 1954: Roman Holiday – Ian McLellan Hunter, Dalton Trumbo, and John Dighton *
 1955: Sabrina – Billy Wilder, Samuel Taylor, and Ernest Lehman
 1956: Mister Roberts – Joshua Logan and Frank Nugent
 1957: Around the World in 80 Days – James Poe, John Farrow, and S. J. Perelman *
 1958: Love in the Afternoon – Billy Wilder and I. A. L. Diamond
 1959: Me and the Colonel – S. N. Behrman and George Froeschel
 1960: Some Like It Hot – Billy Wilder and I. A. L. Diamond
 1961: The Apartment – Billy Wilder and I. A. L. Diamond *
 1962: Breakfast at Tiffany's – George Axelrod
 1963: That Touch of Mink – Stanley Shapiro and Nate Monastar
 1964: Lilies of the Field – James Poe
 1965: Dr. Strangelove – Stanley Kubrick, Terry Southern, and Peter George
 1966: A Thousand Clowns – Herb Gardner
 1967: The Russians Are Coming, the Russians Are Coming – William Rose
 1968: The Graduate – Calder Willingham and Buck Henry
 1969: The Odd Couple – Neil Simon
Best Original Comedy
 1970: Bob & Carol & Ted & Alice – Paul Mazursky and Larry Tucker
 1971: The Out-of-Towners – Neil Simon
 1972: The Hospital – Paddy Chayefsky *
 1973: What's Up, Doc? – Peter Bogdanovich, Buck Henry, David Newman, and Robert Benton
 1974: A Touch of Class – Melvin Frank and Jack Rose
 1975: Blazing Saddles – Mel Brooks, Norman Steinberg, Andrew Bergman, Richard Pryor, and Alan Uger
 1976: Shampoo – Robert Towne and Warren Beatty
 1977: The Bad News Bears – Bill Lancaster
 1978: Annie Hall – Woody Allen and Marshall Brickman *
 1979: Movie Movie – Larry Gelbart and Sheldon Keller
 1980: Breaking Away – Steve Tesich *
 1981: Private Benjamin – Nancy Meyers, Harvey Miller, and Charles Shyer
 1982: Arthur – Steve Gordon
 1983: Tootsie – Don McGuire, Larry Gelbart and Murray Schisgal
 1984: The Big Chill – Lawrence Kasdan and Barbara Benedek
Best Adapted Comedy
 1970: Goodbye, Columbus – Arnold Schulman
 1971: MASH – Ring Lardner Jr. *
 1972: Kotch – John Paxton
 1973: Cabaret – Jay Presson Allen
 1974: Paper Moon – Alvin Sargent
 1975: The Apprenticeship of Duddy Kravitz – Lionel Chetwynd and Mordecai Richler
 1976: The Sunshine Boys – Neil Simon
 1977: The Pink Panther Strikes Again – Blake Edwards and Frank Waldman
 1978: Oh, God! – Larry Gelbart
 1979: Heaven Can Wait – Elaine May and Warren Beatty and Same Time, Next Year – Bernard Slade
 1980: Being There – Jerzy Kosiński
 1981: Airplane! – Jim Abrahams, David Zucker and Jerry Zucker
 1982: Rich and Famous – Gerard Ayres
 1983: Victor/Victoria – Blake Edwards
 1984: Terms of Endearment – James L. Brooks *
Best Written Musical
 1949: Easter Parade – Frances Goodrich, Albert Hackett, and Sidney Sheldon
 1950: On the Town – Adolph Green and Betty Comden
 1951: Annie Get Your Gun – Sidney Sheldon
 1952: An American in Paris – Alan Jay Lerner *
 1953: Singin' in the Rain – Betty Comden and Adolph Green
 1954: Lili – Helen Deutsch and Paul Gallico
 1955: Seven Brides for Seven Brothers – Albert Hackett, Frances Goodrich, and Dorothy Kingsley
 1956: Love Me or Leave Me – Daniel Fuchs and Isobel Lennart *
 1957: The King and I – Ernest Lehman
 1958: Les Girls – Vera Caspary and John Patrick
 1959: Gigi – Alan Jay Lerner *
 1960: The Five Pennies – Robert Smith, Jack Rose, and Melville Shavelson
 1961: Bells Are Ringing – Betty Comden and Adolph Green
 1962: West Side Story – Ernest Lehman
 1963: The Music Man – Meredith Willson, Franklin Lacey, and Marion Hargrove
 1964: Not awarded
 1965: Mary Poppins – Bill Walsh and Don DaGradi
 1966: The Sound of Music – Maria Augusta Trapp, Howard Lindsay, Russel Crouse, and Ernest Lehman
 1967: Not awarded
 1968: Thoroughly Modern Millie – Richard Morris
 1969: Funny Girl – Isobel Lennart
Best Written Film Concerning Problems with the American Scene
 1949: The Snake Pit – Frank Partos and Millen Brand
 1950: All the King's Men – Robert Rossen
 1951: The Men – Carl Foreman
 1952: Bright Victory – Robert Buckner
Best Written Western
 1949: The Treasure of the Sierra Madre – John Huston *
 1950: Yellow Sky – W. R. Burnett and Lamar Trotti
 1951: Broken Arrow – Albert Maltz

Television

Video games 

The video game category was first added in 2008, but discontinued after the 2019 awards.

Outstanding Achievement in Video Game Writing
 2008: Dead Head Fred – Dave Ellis, Adam Cogan
 2009: Star Wars: The Force Unleashed – Haden Blackman, Shawn Pitman, John Stafford, and Cameron Suey
 2010: Uncharted 2: Among Thieves – Amy Hennig
 2011: Assassin's Creed: Brotherhood – Patrice Désilets, Jeffrey Yohalem, and Corey May
 2012: Uncharted 3: Drake's Deception – Amy Hennig
 2013: Assassin's Creed III: Liberation – Richard Farrese and Jill Murray
 2014: The Last of Us – Neil Druckmann
 2015: The Last of Us: Left Behind – Neil Druckmann
 2016: Rise of the Tomb Raider – John Stafford, Cameron Suey, Rhianna Pratchett, and Philip Gelatt
 2017: Uncharted 4: A Thief's End – Neil Druckmann, Josh Scherr, Tom Bissell, and Ryan James
 2018: Horizon Zero Dawn – John Gonzalez, Benjamin McCaw, Ben Schroder, Anne Toole, Dee Warrick, and Meg Jayanth
 2019: God of War – Matt Sophos, Richard Zangrande Gaubert, and Cory Barlog

See also 
 WGA script registration service
 WGA screenwriting credit system
 1960 Writers Guild of America strike
 1988 Writers Guild of America strike
 International Affiliation of Writers Guilds
 2007–08 Writers Guild of America strike
 List of writing awards

References

External links 
 Writers Guild of America awards list
 Writers Guild of America, East website
 Writers Guild of America, West website
 

 
American film awards
American television awards
Awards established in 1949
1949 establishments in the United States